William Peccole Park is a stadium in Reno, Nevada. It is primarily used for baseball, and is the home field of the University of Nevada, Reno Wolf Pack baseball team. It opened in 1988. It holds 3,000 people. It played host to the Reno Silver Sox professional baseball team of the independent Golden Baseball League from 2006 to 2008.

See also
 List of NCAA Division I baseball venues

References

1988 establishments in Nevada
College baseball venues in the United States
Sports venues completed in 1988
Sports venues in Reno, Nevada
Minor league baseball venues
Nevada Wolf Pack baseball
Nevada Wolf Pack sports venues